Yogendra Shukla (1896 – 19 November 1960) was an Indian nationalist and freedom fighter from Bihar. He served in the Cellular Jail (Kala Pani), and he was among the founders of Hindustan Socialist Republican Association (HSRA). Along with Basawon Singh (Sinha) he was among the founder members of the Congress Socialist Party from Bihar.

Background 
Yogendra Shukla and his nephew Baikuntha Shukla (15 May 1907 – 14 May 1934) hailed from Jalalpur village in Muzaffarpur district of Bengal Presidency (now Vaishali district) of Bihar. From 1932 to 1937, Yogendra served a prison sentence in Kalapani, as one of the leaders of the revolutionary movement in Bihar and Uttar Pradesh. He became famous for his many exploits. He was a senior associate of Sardar Bhagat Singh and Batukeshwar Dutt and had even trained them. He had to serve prison terms for a total of more than sixteen and a half years for his revolutionary activities. His strong will was weakened by the severe torture he endured while imprisoned in several jails in India. He was unwell when he passed away, and he was also blind.

Kala Pani 
In October 1932, the Judicial Secretary, A.C.Davies, as directed by the Governor in Council asked the DIG (CID) to suggest the names of the revolutionary convicts with a statement showing the offences for which they had been convicted, the sentence awarded and a brief note showing their connection with the revolutionary movement to transfer them to the Andamans. The DIG (CID) suggested the names of Yogendra Shukla, Basawon Singh (Sinha), Shyamdeo Narayan alias Ram Singh, Ishwar Dayal Singh, Kedar Mani Shukla, Mohit Chandra Adhikari and Ram Pratap Singh.

Yogendra Shukla, Kedar Mani Shukla and Shyamdeo Narayan were transferred to the Andamans in December 1932. In 1937, Yogendra Shukla was transferred to Hazaribagh Central Jail as a result of his 46 days of hunger strike. When Sri Krishna Sinha formed the first Congress ministry in 1937, he took up the cause of political prisoners and his ministry resigned on the issue on 15 February 1938. As a result, the Viceroy conceded the demands and Yogendra Shukla along with other political prisoners was released in March 1938.

After release from Kala Pani 
Yogendra Shukla joined the Indian National Congress after his release and was elected vice-chairman of the Muzaffarpur District Congress Committee. He was also elected a member of the All India Congress Committee in 1938 but later joined the Congress Socialist Party at the instance of Jayaprakash Narayan. He was arrested in 1940, soon after he became a member of Central Committee of the All India Kisan Sabha in place of Swami Sahajanand Saraswati.

Quit India Movement 
When Mahatma Gandhi launched the Quit India Movement in August 1942, Yogendra Shukla scaled the wall of Hazaribagh Central Jail along with Jayaprakash Narayan, Suraj Narayan Singh, Gulab Chand Gupta, Ramnandan Mishra and Shaligram Singh intending to start the underground movement for freedom. As Jayaprakash Narayan was ill then, Shukla walked a distance to Gaya with Jayaprakash Narayan on his shoulders, a distance of about 124 kilometres.

The British Government announced a reward of Rs. 5000 for the arrest of Shukla. He was arrested on 7 December 1942, at Muzaffarpur. The government believed that one day before his arrest Shukla had helped four prisoners escape from Muzaffarpur jail. They were Surajdeo Singh, Ram Babu Kalwar, Brahmanand Gupta and Ganesh Rai.

Yogendra Shukla was lodged in Buxar Jail and kept in bar fetters for three years. In March 1944, he launched hunger-strike in the Buxar Jail.

During and after Independence 
He was released in April 1946. In 1958, he was nominated a member of the Bihar Legislative Council on behalf of the Praja Socialist Party and continued there till 1960. In 1960, he was taken seriously ill as a result of long years of prison life. He died on 19 November 1960.

References

External links 
  Official biography given by the Government of India when a stamp was released on him.

Further reading 
 Manmath Nath Gupta, History of the Indian Revolutionary Movement, (first published in 1939), Somaiya Publications, 1972.
 Naina Singh Dhoot, Surinder Singh, The Political Memoirs of an Indian Revolutionary, Manohar Publishers, New Delhi, 2005, .
 Jayaprakash Narayan: Selected Works, Jayaprakash Narayan, ed. by Bimal Prasad, Manohar, 2000, .
 P. N. Ojha, History of the Indian National Congress in Bihar, 1885-1985, K.P. Jayaswal Research Institute, 1985.
 Onkar Sharad, J P: Jayaprakash Narayan: Biography, Thoughts, Letters, Documents, Sahitya Bhawan, 2nd edn, 1977.
 N.M.P.Srivastava, Colonial Bihar, Independence, and Thereafter: A History of the Searchlight, K.P. Jayaswal Research Institute, Patna, India, 1998.

1896 births
1960 deaths
20th-century Indian politicians
Hindustan Socialist Republican Association
Indian independence activists from Bihar
Indian prisoners and detainees
Indian revolutionaries
Indian socialists
People from Muzaffarpur district
Politicians from Patna
Prisoners and detainees of British India
Revolutionary movement for Indian independence